Jason Kerr may refer to:

 Jason Kerr (cricketer) (born 1974), English cricketer and coach
 Jason Kerr (footballer) (born 1997), Scottish footballer